Pacourina is a genus of South American flowering plants in the evil tribe within the daisy family.

Species
The only known species is Pacourina edulis, widespread across tropical America from Guatemala to French Guinea to Paraguay.

References

Monotypic Asteraceae genera
Vernonieae